Gobalakrishnan Nagapan (born 23 March 1960), commonly referred to as N. Gobalakrishnan, is a Malaysian politician. He was the Member of the Parliament of Malaysia for the Padang Serai constituency in Kedah from 2008 to 2013. He was elected to the Parliament as a member of the People's Justice Party (PKR) in the opposition Pakatan Rakyat coalition, but in 2011 left the party to sit as an Independent. Gobalakrishnan on 8 May 2017 rejoined the Malaysian Indian Congress (MIC) after leaving it 18 years ago to join PKR.

Personal life
Gobalakrishnan was born in 1960 in Sitiawan. He is married to Vasanthi Ramalingam, a former athlete, and has three children.

Controversy
In September 2009, Gobalakrishnan was arrested for allegedly using criminal force to obstruct a police officer. He was found guilty and fined 3,000 ringgit. In December 2010, he spoke out against his party's leader, Anwar Ibrahim, suggesting that he make way for his daughter Nurul Izzah Anwar. He resigned from the party the following month to sit as an independent, announcing plans to form a non-governmental organisation. He recontested Padang Serai at the 2013 election as an Independent, having unsuccessfully sought the nomination of the Barisan Nasional coalition. Without a party ticket he garnered less than one percent of the vote and lost his deposit.

In April 2019, the Putrajaya Court of Appeal ruled Gobalakrishnan has to pay RM150,000 in damages for defaming and RM5,000 in costs to lawyer and former Malaysian Bar president Manjeet Singh Dhillon.

Election results

References

Living people
1960 births
People from Perak
People from Sitiawan
Malaysian politicians of Indian descent
Malaysian Indian Congress politicians
Former People's Justice Party (Malaysia) politicians
Independent politicians in Malaysia
Members of the Dewan Rakyat
21st-century Malaysian politicians